Gu (also Romanized as Gū; also known as Gao, Gaow, Gaū, Gāv, and Gāveh) is a village in Kambel-e Soleyman Rural District, in the Central District of Chabahar County, Sistan and Baluchestan Province, Iran. At the 2006 census, its population was 155, in 33 families.

References 

Populated places in Chabahar County